On 15 October 2012, former Cambodian King and Prime Minister Norodom Sihanouk died at the age of 89, in Beijing, China, after suffering health issues. His death was announced by Deputy Prime Minister Nhek Bun Chhay. His body was brought back on 17 October 2012 by King Norodom Sihamoni and Prime Minister Hun Sen. State flags flew at half mast, and the government announced a 7-day mourning period for the former king.

Death 
Sihanouk had been receiving medical treatment in Beijing since January 2012 for a number of health problems, including colon cancer, diabetes, and hypertension. He died after a heart attack in Beijing on 15 October 2012, 1:20 a.m. Cambodian time, aged 89.

Funeral 
 
A state funeral was held on 17 October 2012 and the National Television of Kampuchea repeatedly screened a 30-minute documentary about his life. Sihanouk's body then reposed in the Royal Palace until 1 February 2013 where it lay in state until 4 February 2013, when it was finally cremated. Sihanouk's royal coffin was adorned with gold and draped with the Royal Standard of the King of Cambodia.

The former king's body was greeted by 90 Buddhist monks who chanted prayers and by tens of thousands citizens waited along the road. Brought into the Royal Palace, his body reposed there until 1 February 2013. Sihanouk's body was removed from the palace on that day, and Cambodians gathered to bid one last farewell to their former leader. His body lay in state for three days and was cremated on 4 February 2013. The obsequies were attended by a number of foreign dignitaries, among whom were French Prime Minister Jean-Marc Ayrault, Thai Prime Minister Yingluck Shinawatra, Vietnamese Prime Minister Nguyen Tan Dung, Filipino Vice President Jejomar Binay, China's Jia Qinglin, Prince Akishino of Japan, Lao Prime Minister Thongsing Thammavong, Singaporean Deputy Prime Minister Tharman Shanmugaratnam, and others.

King Norodom Sihamoni presented Sihanouk with the title "Preah Karuna Preah Bat Samdech Preah Norodom Sihanouk Preah Borom Ratanakkot" (literally "The King Who Lies in the Diamond Urn").

Foreign dignitaries who attended Sihanouk's funeral:

Reactions

Domestic  
 Prince Sisowath Thomico, Sihanouk's assistant and nephew, said "his death was a great loss to Cambodia," adding that the former monarch had dedicated his life "for the sake of his entire nation, country and for the Cambodian people".
 Prime Minister Hun Sen, in a condolence letter to the Queen and King, praised the "remarkable and incomparable" former monarch who will be remembered by his compatriots "for eternity". Hun Sen and King Norodom Sihamoni flew to Beijing to retrieve the former king's body. 
 Yim Sovann, spokesman for the opposition Sam Rainsy Party, praised the late King for bringing democracy to the country along with its independence. 
 Prince Sisowath Sirirath, son of Sisowath Sirik Matak who deposed Sihanouk, said "No matter what happened in the past, he is like a father figure to me and was kind to my family after he returned".

Organisations 
  Secretary-General Ban Ki-moon expressed deep condolences with the royal family and the people of Cambodia. He praised Sihanouk as a 'unifying national leader'.

International 
 : His Majesty the Sultan of Brunei, Hassanal Bolkiah pays his last respects to the former Cambodian king. In his message to King Norodom Sihamoni, His Majesty expressed his great sadness upon learning of the passing of King Norodom Sihanouk, who is the father of King Norodom Sihamoni. His Majesty also stated that the late king was an outstanding statesman who brought much change, promoting stability and development in Cambodia. He would be sadly missed and long remembered by those who knew him. While, in his message to Hun Sen, His Majesty expressed his deep regret upon learning of the passing of former Cambodian king. His Majesty stated that the late king was a great leader whose legacy would be remembered especially his contribution to peace, stability and development in Cambodia. His Majesty, the Bruneian Government and the people of Brunei sent their deepest condolences to the King's family, the Cambodian Government and the people of Cambodia.
 : The Chinese government mourned the death of former Cambodian King Norodom Sihanouk, who was described as "an old friend of the Chinese people" and spent his last days in Beijing, which he regarded as his second home. President Hu Jintao and Premier Wen Jiabao have paid tribute to Sihanouk. Then vice president Xi Jinping expressed his condolences to Queen Mother Monineath in Beijing in person and called the former King an old friend of the Chinese people who had helped forge strong relations between the two countries.
 : French President Francois Hollande was saddened by Sihanouk's death. Hollande described Sihanouk as "Author of the independence of Cambodia, indefatigable defender of his country in the international community, (Sihanouk) was, for many, the symbol of evenhanded Asian policy and... the sovereignty of nations." 

 : President Susilo Bambang Yudhoyono called Sihanouk 'a great friend of Indonesia'. Yudhoyono noted that the former Cambodian king had  "very good relationships" with Indonesia's first President Sukarno and his successor President Suharto.
 : Japanese Prime Minister Yoshihiko Noda sent a statement of condolence to Prime Minister Hun Sen. "He [the King] built a foundation for the relationship between our two countries for the future…and deeply understood Japan’s contribution in seeking peace for Cambodia,” Noda said.
 : Representing the Malaysian Government, Minister in the Prime Minister's Department Tan Sri Dr Koh Tsu Koon paid his last respects to the former Cambodian king. Koh conveyed his condolences to Sihanouk's brother, Norodom Preya Sophon, and laid a wreath as a final respect to the former king whose body was lying instate at the palace. On his message, the minister described Sihanouk as a charismatic leader who brought independence and prosperity to Cambodia, and was an influential leader in strengthening bilateral relations between Malaysia and Cambodia.
 : North Korean leader Kim Jong-un expressed condolences at the death Monday of former Cambodian king Norodom Sihanouk, praising him as a "close friend" of Pyongyang. "I express sincere condolences to the bereaved family and the Cambodian people," Kim said in a message to Sihanouk's son and the current ruler Norodom Sihamoni. 
 : Singaporean Prime Minister Lee Hsien Loong honored Sihanouk as great friend of Singapore. He and his wife attended the royal palace and paid respects to Sihanouk and offered his condolences to the royal family. 
  Thailand: Thai king Bhumibol Adulyadej and the royal family expressed deep sorrow over Sihanouk's death. Prime Minister Yingluck Shinawatra attended the cremation ceremony on behalf of the Thai government. 
 : The Embassy of the United States in Phnom Penh sent their condolences to the King's Family and the Cambodian people on the passing of Sihanouk. 
 : Prime Minister Nguyen Tan Dung expressed deep condolences and led delegation to his funeral. He ordered Hanoi flags to be flown at half-mast.

References 

Death and state funeral of Norodom Sihanouk
Deaths by person in Asia
State funerals in Cambodia
Funerals by person
D
State funerals